Caseyville may refer to:

Places
United States
 Caseyville, Georgia
 Caseyville, Illinois
 Caseyville, Kentucky
 Caseyville, Mississippi
 Caseyville, Missouri